The men's tournament of the 2014 World Senior Curling Championships was held from April 23 to 30 at the Dumfries Ice Bowl in Dumfries, Scotland.

Teams
The teams are listed as follows:

Group A

Group B

Group C

Round-robin standings
Final round-robin standings

Round-robin results

Group A

Thursday, April 24
Draw 1
8:00

Draw 2
11:45

Draw 4
19:30

Friday, April 25
Draw 5
7:30

Draw 7
14:30

Draw 9
21:30

Saturday, April 26
Draw 10
8:30

Draw 11
12:00

Draw 12
15:30

Draw 13
19:00

Sunday, April 27
Draw 14
7:30

Draw 16
14:30

Draw 17
18:00

Draw 18
21:30

Monday, April 28
Draw 19
8:30

Draw 20
12:00

Draw 22
19:00

Tuesday, April 29
Draw 23
8:30

Group B

Thursday, April 24
Draw 2
11:45

Friday, April 25
Draw 5
7:30

Draw 6
11:00

Draw 8
18:00

Draw 9
21:30

Saturday, April 26
Draw 12
15:30

Draw 13
19:00

Sunday, April 27
Draw 15
11:00

Draw 16
14:30

Draw 18
21:30

Monday, April 28
Draw 20
12:00

Draw 22
19:00

Tuesday, April 29
Draw 23
8:30

Group C

Thursday, April 24
Draw 1
8:00

Draw 4
19:30

Friday, April 25
Draw 6
11:00

Draw 7
14:30

Saturday, April 26
Draw 10
8:30

Draw 11
12:00

Sunday, April 27
Draw 14
7:30

Draw 15
11:00

Draw 16
14:30

Draw 17
18:00

Monday, April 28
Draw 19
08:30

Draw 21
15:30

Playoffs

Qualification Game
Tuesday, April 29, 14:00

Quarterfinals
Tuesday, April 29, 19:30

Semifinals
Wednesday, April 30, 8:00

Bronze medal game
Wednesday, April 30, 12:30

Gold medal game
Wednesday, April 30, 12:30

References

External links

World Senior Curling Championships
2014 in curling
2014 in Scottish sport
International curling competitions hosted by Scotland